Jaroslava Mihočková (born 12 June 1971) is a Slovak table tennis player. She competed in the women's doubles event at the 1992 Summer Olympics.

References

1971 births
Living people
Slovak female table tennis players
Olympic table tennis players of Czechoslovakia
Table tennis players at the 1992 Summer Olympics
Sportspeople from Bratislava